Tony Jackson may refer to:

Tony Jackson (basketball, born 1942) (1942–2005), American basketball player in the ABL and ABA
Tony Jackson (basketball, born 1958), American basketball player in the NBA
Tony Jackson (American football) (born 1982), American football fullback 
Tony Jackson (pianist) (1882–1921), American pianist, singer, and composer
Tony Jackson (singer) (1940–2003), English singer and bass guitarist
Tony Jackson (died 2001), English singer with the group Rage

See also
Anthony Jackson (disambiguation)